The USTA Girls 18s National Championships is a prestigious junior tennis tournament held on outdoor hard courts in San Diego. It is the highest level domestic junior tournament hosted by the USTA. The tournament is contested in early August just before the US Open (tennis). The winners of the singles and doubles events are awarded with a wild card into the US Open.

History

Singles champions

Junior tennis
Tennis tournaments in California